Dušan Epifanić (born 12 August 1945) is a Yugoslav former sports shooter. He competed in the 50 metre rifle, prone event at the 1968 Summer Olympics.

References

1945 births
Living people
Sportspeople from Zrenjanin
Yugoslav male sport shooters
Olympic shooters of Yugoslavia
Shooters at the 1968 Summer Olympics